The 17pdr SP Achilles (officially 17 pounder, Self-Propelled, Achilles) was a British variant of the American M10 tank destroyer armed with the British Ordnance QF 17-pounder high-velocity 76.2 mm (3-inch) anti-tank gun in place of the M10's considerably less powerful 3-inch (76.2 mm) Gun M7. A total of 1,100 M10s were converted to Achilles, making it the second most numerous armoured fighting vehicle to carry the 17-pounder gun, behind the Sherman Firefly tank.

The name "Achilles" was officially a designation applied to both the 3-inch gun and 17-pounder versions (as Achilles I/II and Achilles Ic/IIc respectively) but was little used during the Second World War; at the time, the vehicle was called 17pdr M10, or 17pdr SP M10, or even occasionally, "Firefly". It has since become identified almost exclusively with the 17 pounder version.

Origins
In the wake of Germany's successful 1939–41 campaigns, US armor doctrine had incorporated the idea of fast, lightly armoured vehicles carrying high-velocity anti-tank guns as the best way to deal with the fast-moving spearheads of the German blitzkrieg. The M10 was based on the chassis of the M4 Sherman but carried thinner although more sloped armor in order to comply with the high-speed requirement for the tank. At the same time, the British had been examining the possibility of designing a low-silhouette self-propelled anti-tank gun, preferably with a 360-degree traversing turret, with armour that would be able to resist the German 5 cm KwK 39 gun fitted to German tanks at 800 yards and mounting the 17-pounder anti-tank gun. However, with the arrival of the M10 on the battlefield in late 1942, British plans for a turreted self-propelled gun were cancelled.

During the North African campaign, the British did use self-propelled AT guns such as 6-pdr Deacon. The Valentine tank chassis was fitted with the 17-pdr to create the Archer which was used later in north-west Europe.

The armour of the M10 provided good protection against the 50 mm gun mounted on most German tanks and anti-tank guns. The M10 was first made available to the British in 1943. These vehicles were open-topped and mounted a 3-inch (76.2 mm) M7 American gun, which was significantly more powerful than the Ordnance QF 6-pounder that was mounted on British tanks of the period and was of equal power to the 7.5 cm KwK 40 used by the Panzer IV and Sturmgeschütz III.

Design

The 17 pdr SP Achilles was basically a modified M10, the principal difference being the gun. The main armament of the Achilles was the Ordnance QF 17-pounder, a substantially more powerful gun than the 3 in (76.2 mm) M7 mounted on the standard M10. The single top-mounted .50 inch (12.7 mm) M2 Browning heavy machine gun was retained.

When supplied, Armour-piercing discarding sabot (APDS) ammunition could penetrate some 209  mm (8 inches) of armor at 500 meters and 192  mm at 1,000 meters at a 30-degree angle, though the accuracy of the APDS round was poor during the war. In comparison, the M7 gun on the standard M10 using the same type of ammunition (APCBC) would penetrate 98  mm of armor at 500 m at a 30-degree angle, and 88  mm of armor at 1,000 meters at a 30-degree angle. Only with High-Velocity Armour Piercing (HVAP) ammunition did that gun compare with the 17-pounder, the ammunition being able to penetrate 140  mm at 500 m at a 30-degree angle, and 127  mm at 1,000 m at a 30-degree angle. However, 3-inch HVAP ammunition was in very short supply, whereas the standard 17-pounder ammunition was available in huge quantities for the British.

The 17-pounder required a counterweight fitted behind the muzzle brake on its long barrel. This gave the Achilles a distinctive appearance compared to the comparatively short-barrelled, brakeless, entirely straight barrel of the M10.  Once the Germans discovered the effectiveness of the Achilles' gun on the same M10 carriage as the much less powerful M7 gun, attempts were made to disguise the 17-pounder by painting its brake and counterweight.

Production

The desire to mount the 17-pounder on the M10 was governed by the degree of difficulty involved in mounting the 17-pounder on the tank itself. Luckily for the British, the initial batches of M10s had an easily modified gun mounting to facilitate the future replacement of the older 3-inch M7 gun with the newer 76 mm gun M1. This gun mounting design allowed for the British to replace the 3-inch gun with the 17-pounder gun. The British took delivery of some 845 vehicles in 1943, but of the second version of the M10, only the T71 mark designed to carry the M1 gun could carry the 17-pounder.

The British had planned to convert some 1,000 M10s into 17pdr armed variants for Normandy, but for some reason conversions were not started until April 1944. By 6 June 1944, only some 124 M10s had been converted; however, the number of conversions post D-day increased and by the end of the year 816 M10s had been converted, 152 vehicles in November alone. However, the low numbers at the start of the invasion of Normandy meant both that many British units went ashore fielding standard M10s and losses in Achilles units were often replaced by standard 3-inch armed M10s.

As a self-propelled anti-tank gun, both Achilles and standard M10s were distributed to and operated by the regiments of the Royal Artillery. Around 1,650 M10s were received by the British during the war, with 1,100 converted to the 17-pdr by its end.

Operational use
The standard anti-tank gun used in infantry units in the British Army was the QF 6-pounder gun a small, light gun able to defeat the more common German Panzer IV and Sturmgeschütz with regular ammunition but not the heavier Panthers and Tigers front on. The next generation British anti-gun, the 17-pounder, was able to deal with Tigers and Panthers but had a far longer emplacement time prior to battle than the 6-pounder due to its larger size, often taking a day to fully prepare for action.

As a result, the British used the Achilles as a quickly deployable anti-tank gun, able to reinforce a position taken by infantry and engage counter-attacking German forces while the slower towed 17-pounders were pulled up and dug in for a more long-term defensive presence. This had the advantage of mitigating the weak armour protection of the Achilles as being used defensively usually allowed it to fire the vital first shot. This was in line with the original design concept of the vehicle, intended to blunt German "blitzkrieg" attack tactics. The M10/Achilles turret had an extremely slow manual only turret rotation, a limited tactical disadvantage when the tank was used only in a defensive role. As such, they had an advantage over the German Sturmgeschütz, which had no turret rotation. However, the Sturmgeschütz's low profile and heavy armour were significant assets that allowed it to be successful in its different tactical environment. Usually, the only time the British used the M10 and Achilles offensively was in support of Churchill tank units, which lacked the associated 17 pdr-armed tanks that Sherman and Cromwell tank units had.

Achilles went ashore on D-Day, equipping units of the Royal Artillery and Royal Canadian Artillery in Armoured Division or Corps Anti-tank Regiments. A typical A/Tk Regiment would have 4 Batteries, 2 x Towed 17 Pdr Batteries, 1 x Achilles and 1 x M10 Battery. The M10 Battery was replaced by a second Achilles Battery as more vehicles became available. Perhaps the most successful action of the Achilles was conducted by B troop, 245th Battery, 62nd Anti-Tank Regiment, Royal Artillery attached to the Royal Hamilton Light Infantry during Operation Charnwood. South of Buron, a counterattack by a mixed force of Panzer IV and Panther tanks of the 12th SS Panzer Regiment was defeated by Achilles and 17-pounder anti tank guns of 245th Battery, 62nd Anti-tank Regiment. Thirteen German tanks were destroyed in one of the most successful antitank engagements of the campaign, for the loss of four self-propelled guns and a further four damaged.

Surviving examples

See also
 Archer (tank destroyer) - a 17 pdr gun in a fixed position on a Valentine tank chassis.
 M36 tank destroyer - an American 90mm gun upgrade of the M10

References

Further reading

World War II tanks of the United Kingdom
Sherman
World War II tank destroyers
Military vehicles introduced from 1940 to 1944